Primmore's Pride is a 7/8 Thoroughbred gelding. He was foaled in 1993, the offspring of Mayhill (sire) and Primmore Hill (dam). He is owned by Denise & Roger Lincoln and ridden by Pippa Funnell, who achieved the Grand Slam of eventing in 2003 by winning the Rolex Kentucky Three Day, Badminton Horse Trials, and Burghley Horse Trials while riding Primmore's Pride.

History
Major results to date:
 1st Burghley Young Event Horse Final as a 5-year-old
 1st Le Lion d'Anger 7 year old World Championship
 4th Blenheim CCI*** 2001
 2nd Punchestown CCI*** 2002
 6th Burghley 2002
 2nd British Open Championships Gatcombe and National Champion 2002
 1st Rolex Kentucky 2003
 1st Burghley 2003
 Team Silver Athens Olympics 2004
 Individual Bronze Athens Olympics 2004
 1st Badminton 2005

References

External links
Equestrianism: Funnell's Pride of place

1993 animal births
Eventing horses